Teanau Tuiono (born 25 December 1972) is a New Zealand politician. In 2020 he became a Member of Parliament in the House of Representatives as a representative of the Green Party of Aotearoa New Zealand.

Early life and career
Tuiono was born on 25 December 1972. Tuiono grew up in Te Atatū and Ōtāhuhu, with a two-year period in Rarotonga. He initially enrolled for an engineering certificate but partway through changed to a BA in Māori Studies at the University of Auckland. He credits an environmental paper he took there, taught by Jeanette Fitzsimons, as turning him into environmental activism. He followed his BA with a law degree, also from the University of Auckland.

By profession, Tuiono is an education consultant who has previously worked at both the United Nations and was the activist in residence at Massey University.

Tuiono attended the protests at the anti-Springbok tour protests in 1981. Prior to entering parliament, he organised protests for subjects such as GCSB laws, the TPPA, and support for Australian Aboriginal rights. He was also involved in translating Facebook into Māori. In 2021, during a debate on new anti-terrorism laws he recalled how his home had been raided by police during the 2007 New Zealand police raids.

Political career

Tuiono stood for the Green Party at the  election and was 16th on the party list. This was not high enough for Tuiono to be elected to parliament, as the party won only 8 seats.

At the 2019 local-body elections, Tuiono stood for Mayor of Palmerston North as the Green Party candidate, running a campaign focusing on the local effects of climate change. He finished a distant second to incumbent Grant Smith.

He came third place in Palmerston North, with 2,039 votes. With the Greens winning 10 seats, he became a list Member of Parliament. Tuiono is the Green Party's first Pasifika MP.

During his campaign, Tuiono pledged to tackle wealth inequality in New Zealand.

Views and positions
In December 2020, Tuiono joined fellow Green MP Golriz Ghahraman and Labour MP Ibrahim Omer in pledging to form a new parliamentary Palestine friendship group to "raise the voices of Palestinian peoples in the New Zealand Parliament" during an event organised by the Wellington Palestine advocacy group to mark the International Day of Solidarity with the Palestinian people.

Tuiono serves as his party's agriculture spokesperson. He supports regenerative agriculture and a move away from intensive dairy farming. He considers it appropriate for MPs to be able to pledge allegiance to Te Tiriti O Waitangi instead of to the queen.

References

External links
 

Living people
New Zealand left-wing activists
Green Party of Aotearoa New Zealand MPs
Members of the New Zealand House of Representatives
New Zealand list MPs
Unsuccessful candidates in the 2017 New Zealand general election
Māori MPs
Ngāpuhi people
Ngāi Takoto people
New Zealand people of Cook Island descent
Cook Island Māori people
People from Auckland
1972 births